Lee Byeong-heon (born 23 July 1980) is a South Korean film director and screenwriter. He is best known for his 2015 film Twenty and 2019 film Extreme Job, the latter of which broke the record for the highest-grossing South Korean film.

Filmography

Film

Television

Awards and nominations

References

External links
 
 
 

1980 births
Living people
South Korean film directors
South Korean screenwriters